Prashant Shetty, known professionally as Rishab Shetty, is an Indian actor and film maker who primarily works in Kannada cinema. He is known for his critical and commercial blockbuster, Kantara, for which he directed and acted as the main lead. He is the recipient of several accolades, including the National Film Award for Best Children's Film at the 66th National Film Awards for Sarkari Hi. Pra. Shaale, Kasaragodu, Koduge: Ramanna Rai.

Early life
Shetty was born on 7 July 1983 in Keradi village of Kundapura taluk, in Udupi district, Karnataka. He did his schooling from Kundapura and later joined Vijaya College to pursue B.Com. He started his theater journey by doing yakshagana plays in Kundapura. He actively participated in plays while studying in Bengaluru. He was appreciated for his work and success in these plays encouraged him to pursue acting as a professional career.

Film career
After his college, Rishab Shetty worked in several odd jobs like selling water cans, real estate and did hotel work while also parallelly trying his chances in movies. While working he also acquired a diploma in film direction from the Government Film and TV Institute in Bangalore. He started working in film industry as a clap boy, spot boy, assistant director etc. He met Rakshit Shetty while working in the industry, they became friends later on.

His first major role was in the movie Tuglak. He played a small role of a police officer in Pawan Kumar's Lucia and then played a key role in the film Ulidavaru Kandante, which was directed by Rakshit Shetty. Then in 2016, his debut directorial movie Ricky starring Rakshit Shetty released which received an average response at the box office. In the same year, he directed Kirik Party, which became an industry hit. After Kirik Party Shetty went on to direct Sarkari Hi. Pra. Shaale, the movie received a good response from the audience as well as critics and went on to win the National Film Award for Best Children's Film at the 66th National Film Awards.

He debuted as a lead in Bell Bottom (2019 film) which was a well received Kannada movie of 2019. Rishab Shetty's major role after Bell Bottom was of Mangaluru-based Gangster 'Hari' in the film Garuda Gamana Vrishabha Vahana released in the year 2021, the film was a commercial and critical success in which the performance of Rishab Shetty and Raj B. Shetty was widely appreciated by critics and audience.

Kantara and national recognition
In 2022 Rishab Shetty in collaboration with Hombale Films released the movie Kantara which he directed and starred in. Kantara was a super hit of 2022, becoming the second highest-grossing Kannada movie of all time. Initially released only in the Kannada language and after receiving rave reviews and a massive box office collection, the movie was released in four other Indian languages. The movie received nationwide appreciation with several actors and movie critics praising the movie and Shetty's performance as a protagonist.

Filmography

As actor

As director, writer and producer

Awards

References

Further reading

External links
 

Male actors from Karnataka
Indian male film actors
21st-century Indian film directors
Living people
People from Udupi district
Male actors in Kannada cinema
Film directors from Karnataka
Kannada film directors
Filmfare Awards South winners
21st-century Indian male actors
1983 births
Directors who won the Best Children's Film National Film Award
Producers who won the Best Children's Film National Film Award